Education policy consists of the principles and policy decisions that influence the field of education, as well as the collection of laws and rules that govern the operation of education systems. Education governance may be shared between the local, state, and federal government at varying levels. Some analysts see education policy in terms of  social engineering.

Education takes place in many forms for many purposes through many institutions. Examples of such educational institutions may include early childhood education centers, kindergarten to 12th grade schools, two- and four-year colleges or universities, graduate and professional education institutes, adult-education establishments, and job-training schemes. The educational goals of these institutions influence education policy. Furthermore, these education policies can affect the education people engage in at all ages. 

Examples of areas subject to debate in education policy, specifically from the field of schools, include school size, class size, school choice, school privatization, police in schools, tracking, teacher selection, education and certification, teacher pay, teaching methods,  curricular content, graduation requirements, school-infrastructure investment, and the values that schools are expected to uphold and model. 

Issues in education policy also address problems within higher education. The Pell Institute analyzes the barriers experienced by teachers and students within community colleges and universities. These issues involve undocumented students, sex education, and federal-grant aides. 

Education policy analysis is the scholarly study of education policy. It seeks to answer questions about the purpose of education, the objectives (societal and personal) that it is designed to attain, the methods for attaining them and the tools for measuring their success or failure. Research intended to inform education policy is carried out in a wide variety of institutions and in many academic disciplines. For example, researchers are affiliated with schools and departments of education, public policy, psychology, economics, sociology, and human development. Additionally, sociology, political science, economics, and law are all disciplines that can be used to better understand how education systems function, what their impacts are, and how policies might be changed for different conditions. Education policy is sometimes considered a sub-field of social policy and public policy. Examples of education policy analysis may be found in such academic journals as Education Policy Analysis Archives and in university-policy centers such as the National Education Policy Center housed at the University of Colorado Boulder.

Education reform in the United States 

Over the past 30 years, policymakers have made a steady increase at the state and federal levels of government in their involvement of US schools. According to the Tenth Amendment to the United States Constitution, state governments have the main authority on education. State governments spend most of their budgets funding schools, whereas only a small portion of the federal budget is allocated to education. The federal government advances their role by building on state and local education policies. Over time, the role of the federal government grew through federal education policies that affected the funding and evaluation of education. For example, the National Defense Education Act (NDEA) was established in 1958 to increase federal funding to schools, and the National Assessment of Educational Progress was created to track and compare student performance in academic subjects across the states. Moreover, the United States Department of Education was created in 1979. 

Education reform is currently being seen as a "tangled web" due to the nature of education authority. Some education policies are being defined at either the federal, state or local level and in most cases, their authorities overlap one another. This manner of authority has led many to believe there is an inefficiency within education governance. Compared to other OECD countries, educational governance in the US is more decentralized and most of its autonomy is found within the state and district levels. The reason for this is that US citizens put an emphasis on individual rights and fear federal government overreach. A recent report by the National Center on Education and the Economy, believes that the education system is neither coherent nor likely to see improvements due to the nature of it.

A critical race theory analysis of the history of education reform in the United States reveals the influence of systemic racism on educational policy. Historically, educational policy changes have resulted via progress from protest, and such progress met with pushback.

In the state of Texas during the 84th Legislature, there were several education reform bills filed and sponsored by many education reform groups, such as Texans for Education Reform.  Lawmakers want to create more involvement at the local level, and more transparency in our public schools.  These groups are being pressured and opposed by teachers' unions saying that accountability and transparency policies are targeting educators, and that they are trying to hold them responsible for the education system.

Teacher policy 
Teacher policy is education policy that addresses the preparation, recruitment, and retention of teachers. A teacher policy is guided by the same overall vision and essential characteristics as the wider education policy: it should be strategic, holistic, feasible, sustainable, and context-sensitive. Overall objectives and major challenges to be addressed, the funding to achieve these objectives, the demographic parameters of the learner population and the human resources required to achieve universally accessible quality education should all be addressed in a comprehensive teacher policy.

Nine key dimensions 
Nine key dimensions are considered crucial to any comprehensive teacher policy: Teacher Recruitment and Retention, Teacher education (initial and continuing), Deployment, Career Structures/Paths, Teacher Employment and Working Conditions, Teach Reward and Remuneration, Teacher Standards, Teacher Accountability, and School Governance.

Teacher Recruitment and Retention 
An effective education system must have a safe way to attract, recruit and retain outstanding educators. There has been a growing demand for teachers but the supply continues to diminish and many of them leave their profession. This development is a threat to the "academic and economic welfare of students". It affects learning and drain taxpayers’ money. The federal and state governments along with the districts must invest in complete human capital systems. It is the best approach in preparing and retaining committed and capable mentors for the long-term. A reasonable strategy in talent management for the education sector must focus on recruitment, development, and retention of intelligent and efficient teachers.

Teacher Education (Initial and Continuing) 
Teachers need to go back to school periodically to become better educators. Good mentors can become outstanding by going further than textbooks. This is the logic behind continuing education. Technology in the form of web-based workshops and lectures will be helpful. School administrators and district officials must push their teachers to make use of available resources and opportunities to continue the learning process. Conferences with workshops are also valuable because these activities provide teachers with tools for integration of technology in the classrooms and Continuing Professional Development Units in boosting their careers. School administrators must ensure that teachers are not only competent in classroom management but also in protecting students from harm such as bullying.

Gender equality 

Quality and timely data and evidence are key factors for policy-making, planning and the delivery to advance gender equality in and through education. They can help countries to identify and analyse gendered patterns and trends, and better plan and target resources to address gender inequalities. They can also help to identify and inform interventions that influence participation, learning and empowerment, from early childhood to tertiary education and beyond.

Though the SDG 4 monitoring framework is a step forward in the policy process, a complete monitoring framework for gender equality in and through education should include indicators that consider: social and gender norms, values and attitudes (many of which can be influenced by education); education laws and policies, as well legislation and policies outside of the education system; resource distribution; and teaching and learning practices and environments. Efforts are also needed to track disparities in informal and non-formal learning contexts with a lifelong learning approach, and to ensure that data are collected on the most excluded.

See also
Education policy in Brazil
Higher education policy

Sources

References
Information on education policy, OECD - Contains indicators and information about education policy in OECD countries.

External links

 OECD's Education GPS: a review of education policy analysis and statistics.